Marinus Adrianus Koekkoek, sometimes referred to as The Elder (25 September 1807 – 28 January 1868) was a 19th-century Dutch landscape and marine painter.

Life and work
He was a member of the famous ; second son of the marine artist, Johannes Hermanus Koekkoek, brother of Barend Cornelis, and Hermanus. His son was the landscape painter, Hendrik Pieter Koekkoek.

Marinus and his brothers received their first art lessons from their father, who provided advice and assistance throughout their careers. Initially, he worked as a decorative painter.

He established himself as a free-lance painter in Amsterdam in 1836. The following year, he moved to Kleef. From 1838, he alternated between Hilversum and Amsterdam. He finally settled in Amsterdam in 1854, and remained there until his death, aged sixty.

At first, he painted nothing but landscapes. Later, he expanded to portraits, animals, and maritime scenes.ne views. He was awarded a silver medal for his landscapes from the Felix Meritis society in 1847. Many of his works were sold in Germany and England.

References

Further reading
 Toni Wappenschmidt, "Marinen und Landschaften der holländischen Romantik", In: ''Die Weltkunst, 1-3-1992, pp.541-543
 Simonis, Mariëtte (et al.) De familie Koekkoek: vier generaties schildertalent - een collectie schilderijen en aquarellen uit de periode 1800 tot 1950 van de voornaamste leden van het Hollandse schildersgeslacht, 2003, Simonis & Buunk
 Pieter A. Scheen: Lexicon Nederlandse beeldende kunstenaars, 1750–1950, Gravenhage 1981, pg.278

External links

 Marinus Adrianus Koekkoek the Elder on ArtNet

1807 births
1868 deaths
Painters from Middelburg
19th-century Dutch painters
Dutch male painters
19th-century Dutch male artists